Miklós Holop (2 February 1925 – 12 November 2017) was a Hungarian water polo player who competed in the 1948 Summer Olympics. He was born in Budapest. He was part of the Hungarian team which won the silver medal. He played all seven matches.

See also
 List of Olympic medalists in water polo (men)

References
 Miklós Holop's obituary

External links
 

1925 births
2017 deaths
Water polo players from Budapest
Hungarian male water polo players
Water polo players at the 1948 Summer Olympics
Olympic silver medalists for Hungary in water polo
Medalists at the 1948 Summer Olympics
20th-century Hungarian people
21st-century Hungarian people